Joel Iwataki is an American sound engineer. He has won one Primetime Emmy Award. He has worked on more than 150 films.

He is a registered sex offender.

Selected filmography

References

External links

American audio engineers
Emmy Award winners
Living people
1951 births